Lukas Hoffmann (born 13 April 1997) is a German footballer who plays as a centre back for FC 08 Homburg.

References

External links
 

1997 births
People from Homburg, Saarland
Footballers from Saarland
Living people
German footballers
Association football defenders
SG Sonnenhof Großaspach players
SSV Ulm 1846 players
SGV Freiberg players
FC 08 Homburg players
3. Liga players
Regionalliga players
Oberliga (football) players